Roviano is a  (municipality) in the Metropolitan City of Rome in the Italian region of Latium, located about  northeast of Rome.

Roviano borders the following municipalities: Anticoli Corrado, Arsoli, Cineto Romano, Mandela, Marano Equo, Riofreddo. It is home to polygonal walls dating to the late Aequi age, or to the early Roman domination. It has also a bridge dating to the reign of Nerva, over which the via Valeria crossed the Aniene river.

Other sights include the castle, built by the abbots of Italy, the medieval borough of Rovianello (destroyed by Muzio Colonna in 1585–90), the 14th century Porta Scaramuccia ("Skirmish Gate").

References

External links
 Official website

Cities and towns in Lazio